Lord Harry Powlett may refer to:
Harry Powlett, 4th Duke of Bolton (1691–1759), so called from 1691 until 1754
Harry Powlett, 6th Duke of Bolton (1720–1794), so called from 1754 until 1765
Harry Powlett, 4th Duke of Cleveland (1803–1859)

See also
Henry Powlett, 3rd Baron Bayning